Kathryn Katie Ball (born 8 June 1963) is a former British rower who competed at the 1984 Summer Olympics.

Rowing career
Ball began rowing as a teenager at for Broxbourne Rowing Club. She was selected for the 1979 FISA Junior Championships but fell ill and did not compete. However the following year she did row in the 1980 and 1981 FISA Junior Championships.

Ball was part of the coxless fours crew, with Tessa Millar, Kareen Marwick, Kate McNicol and Sue Bailey, that won the national title rowing for the A.R.A Squad, at the 1983 National Rowing Championships which led to selection for the Great Britain team at the 1983 World Rowing Championships.

She was selected to represent Great Britain at the 1984 Olympic Games in the women's coxed four event. The crew of Ball, Millar, Jean Genchi, Joanna Toch and Kathy Talbot finished in seventh place. Another final World Championship appearance ensued in 1985.

References

External links
 

1963 births
Living people
British female rowers
Olympic rowers of Great Britain
Rowers at the 1984 Summer Olympics
People from Bishop's Stortford